This is a list of Bishops, Metropolitans, and Archbishops of Athens. The Church of Athens was created by Paul the Apostle during his second missionary journey, when he preached at the Areopagus, probably in 51 AD. According to the Acts of the Apostles (17:16–34), after the sermon, many became followers of Paul, thus forming the kernel of the Church in Athens. The see of Athens has been unilaterally declared autocephalous on 4 August 1833 (officially recognized by the Ecumenical Patriarchate of Constantinople on 11 July 1850) and was elevated to an archbishopric on 31 December 1923. As the head of the Church of Greece, the holder has styled Archbishop of Athens and All Greece (Αρχιεπίσκοπος Αθηνών και πάσης Ελλάδος).

Bishops of Athens

Metropolitans of Athens

Pre-modern period

Modern period

Archbishops of Athens and All Greece

See also
Church of Greece
Archbishopric of Athens
Catholic Church in Greece
Roman Catholic Archdiocese of Athens

References

External links

  Archdiocese of Athens Official website.
  Ιστορία της Εκκλησίας των Αθηνών: Διατελέσαντες Αρχιεπίσκοποι και Μητροπολίτες Αθηνών. Ιερά Αρχιεπισκοπή Αθηνών. 

 
Athens
Athens
Athens
Archbishops of Athens
Archbishops, Athens
papase of Athens